Wang Wenliang (born 1954) is a Chinese construction executive and elected official. He was a member of the 12th National People's Congress, but was removed from it over allegations of vote fraud. He is or was chair of Dandong Port Group. 

He served on the board of governors of New York University and made a large donation to it.

References

 

 

Delegates to the 12th National People's Congress
Living people
1954 births